Bowling Green Township is one of the 25 townships of Licking County, Ohio, United States. As of the 2010 census, the population was 1,747.

Geography
Located in the southeastern corner of the county, it borders the following townships:
Franklin Township - north
Hopewell Township - northeast
Hopewell Township, Muskingum County - east
Madison Township, Perry County - southeast corner
Hopewell Township, Perry County - south
Thorn Township, Perry County - southwest
Licking Township - west

No municipalities are located in Bowling Green Township, although the unincorporated community of Brownsville lies in the northeastern part of the township.

Name and history
Statewide, the only other Bowling Green Township is located in Marion County. The township is located within the Refugee Tract.

Government
The township is governed by a three-member board of trustees, who are elected in November of odd-numbered years to a four-year term beginning on the following January 1. Two are elected in the year after the presidential election and one is elected in the year before it. There is also an elected township fiscal officer, who serves a four-year term beginning on April 1 of the year after the election, which is held in November of the year before the presidential election. Vacancies in the fiscal officership or on the board of trustees are filled by the remaining trustees.

References

External links

County website

Townships in Licking County, Ohio
Townships in Ohio